Gen'ichirō, Genichirō, Genichiro or Genichirou (written: 源一郎 or 玄一郎) is a masculine Japanese given name. Notable people with the name include:

, Japanese writer
, Japanese politician
, Japanese mathematician
, Japanese writer
, Japanese professional wrestler

Fictional characters
, a character in the video game Sekiro: Shadows Die Twice
, a character in the manga series The Prince of Tennis

Japanese masculine given names